Narikot is a town and Village Development Committee in Pyuthan, a Middle Hills district of Lumbini Province, western Nepal.

Villages in this VDC

References
 Narikot:

External links
UN map of VDC boundaries, water features and roads in Pyuthan District

Populated places in Pyuthan District